Krohg may refer to:

 Christian Krohg (government minister) (1777–1828), Norwegian politician
 Christian Krohg (1852–1925), Norwegian naturalist painter and writer
 Hilmar Meincke Krohg (1776–1851), Norwegian politician
 Oda Krohg (1860–1935), Norwegian painter
 Per Krohg (1889–1965), Norwegian artist

See also
 Krogh
 Krog (surname)

Norwegian-language surnames